José Juan Rivera Ramos (born 21 December 1970 in Copán Department) is a Honduran politician. He currently serves as deputy of the National Congress of Honduras representing the National Party of Honduras for La Paz.

References

1970 births
Living people
People from La Paz Department (Honduras)
Deputies of the National Congress of Honduras
National Party of Honduras politicians
People from Copán Department